Ibrahim Al Hatrash (born 7 July 1990) is a Saudi football player. He plays as a winger.

References

1990 births
Living people
Saudi Arabian footballers
Najran SC players
Damac FC players
Al-Diriyah Club players
Al-Sharq Club players
Al-Saqer FC players
Saudi First Division League players
Saudi Professional League players
Saudi Second Division players
Association football wingers